The 2011 Sikkim earthquake (also known as the 2011 Himalayan earthquake) occurred with a moment magnitude of 6.9 and was centered within the Kanchenjunga Conservation Area, near the border of Nepal and the Indian state of Sikkim, at  on Sunday, 18 September. The earthquake was felt across northeastern India, Nepal, Bhutan, Bangladesh and southern Tibet.

At least 111 people were killed in the earthquake. Most of the deaths occurred in Sikkim, with reports of fatalities in and near Singtam in the East Sikkim district. Several buildings collapsed in Gangtok. Eleven are reported dead in Nepal, including three killed when a wall collapsed in the British Embassy in Kathmandu. Elsewhere, structural damage occurred in Bangladesh, Bhutan, and across Tibet; another seven fatalities were confirmed in the latter region.

The quake came just a few days after an earthquake of 4.2 magnitude hit Haryana's Sonipat district, sending tremors in New Delhi. The earthquake was the fourth significant earthquake in India of September 2011.

Exactly a year after the original earthquake at 5:55 pm on 18 September 2012, another earthquake of magnitude 4.1 struck Sikkim, sparking panic among the people observing the anniversary of the original quake.

Earthquake
The magnitude 6.9 (Mw) earthquake occurred inland at 18:10 IST on 18 September 2011, about 68 km (42 mi) northwest of Gangtok, Sikkim at a shallow depth of 19.7 km (12.2 mi). At this location, the continental Indian and Eurasian Plates converge with one another along a tectonic boundary beneath the mountainous region of northeast India near the Nepalese border. Although earthquakes in this region are usually interplate in nature, preliminary data suggests the Sikkim earthquake was triggered by shallow strike-slip faulting from an intraplate source within the over-riding Eurasian Plate. Initial analyses also indicate a complex origin, with the perceived tremor likely being a result of two separate events occurring close together in time at similar focal depths.

Intensity 

Located at a shallow depth beneath the surface, the earthquake caused strong shaking in many areas adjacent to its epicenter reportedly lasting 30–40 seconds. The strongest shaking occurred to the west in Gangtok and further south in Siliguri, although similar ground motions registering at VI (Strong) on the Modified Mercalli intensity scale were recorded in many smaller towns such as Mangan across elevated regions. Lighter tremors (IV–III) spread southward through populous regions, with these motions reported in the Patna capital of Bihar and as far southwest as Bihar Sharif. Tremors were felt in Assam, Meghalaya, Tripura, parts of West Bengal, Bihar, Jharkhand, Uttar Pradesh, Rajasthan, Chandigarh and Delhi states of India. In Tibet, the earthquake was felt in Shigatse and Lhasa. In all, the earthquake was felt in Nepal, India, Bhutan, Bangladesh and China.

Aftershocks
Sikkim experienced three aftershocks within a span of 30 minutes after the mainshock occurring with magnitudes of 5.7, 5.1, and 4.6. Kathmandu experienced two aftershocks that both had a magnitude of 4.8 . The aftershocks had no serious impact in the region. At least 20 aftershocks back-to-back throughout the night caused panic in the Gangtok.

Impact

The earthquake struck near a mountainous, albeit very populous region near the Sikkim–Nepal border; most of the structures were highly vulnerable to earthquake shaking. Upon impact, tens of thousands of residents evacuated their homes, and many areas suffered from communication and power outages. The strong shaking caused significant building collapse and mudslides; at least 111 people were confirmed killed and hundreds sustained injuries by the effects of the earthquake. As the earthquake occurred during the monsoon season, heavy rain and landslides made rescue work increasingly difficult.

India 
Northern India suffered the worst from the earthquake, with at least 75 people killed. Sixty people were reportedly killed in Sikkim alone. At least seven people died in Bihar while six deaths have been reported in West Bengal. Power supply was disrupted in areas near Sikkim, including Kalimpong of Darjeeling district, and adjoining Jalpaiguri and Cooch Behar districts; the outages were in part blamed on an affected electric substation in Siliguri. Water supply was interrupted in Sikkim. National Highway 31, the major highway linking Sikkim to the rest of India, was damaged. Ten of the dead were workers at a hydroelectric project on the Teesta River.

In India, the total property damage is estimated to be around $22.3 billion USD, making it one of the costliest natural disasters in Indian history.

Sikkim 

Two buildings of the Indo-Tibetan Border Police in the Pegong areas of North Sikkim collapsed. In Gangtok, many government offices and hospitals were left unusable. The heavy shaking destroyed the villages of Lingzya, Sakyong, Pentong, Bay and Tholong.

Nepal 
In the capital city of Nepal, Kathmandu, damage from the earthquake was comparatively limited. Three people were killed when a wall at the British Embassy collapsed, and many others suffered injuries. The shaking effects were more severe in eastern Nepal, closer to the epicenter. There, hundreds of homes sustained significant damage, and due to saturated soil from preceding heavy rains widespread mudslides impacted the region. Sunsari experienced power and telephone communication outages. Two people were killed in the eastern city of Dharan. Overall, in Nepal 6 people died due to the earthquake.

Bangladesh
The earthquake was felt most strongly in northern Bangladesh. The quake was also felt in Dhaka, Rajshahi, Sylhet, Mymensingh, Barisal, Faridpur, Jessore, Khulna, Pabna, Bogra, Comilla, Noakhali, Chittagong and as far as Cox's Bazar. Panicked people rushed out of their homes and offices, but the only damage seems to be tilted and cracked buildings; no casualties were reported. Cell phone lines were also down for a few minutes during the quake.

China 
In Tibet, building collapse was reported in Yadong, Dinggyê and Gamba. At least seven people were reported dead in Yadong. Telephone service was interrupted in the seat of Yadong County.

Bhutan 
There were no reports of casualties in Bhutan, although cracks in walls and ceilings of houses were reported in Wangthangkha village, Lango and in the town area of Paro. There were also reports of a landslide right after crossing the Isuna Bridge from Paro towards Thimphu, and falling boulders after crossing Chundzom Bridge. Citizens were asked to avoid traveling on the Paro-Thimphu highway. Telecommunications networks were disrupted, with cellular networks unavailable after the quake.

Prime Minister of Bhutan Jigmi Thinley updated in his status as "Phone lines remains clogged reflecting our caring and close knit society. No damage reported from East Bhutan. Four road blocks caused by falling debris are reported on the Chukha–Phuntsholing road. Two homes in Haa report damage with three to four people having suffered minor injury. Thimphu Dzong has sustained some cracks in the Utse and one of the four corner towers. Occupants have been moved out to safer parts. Please remain calm and alert."

Rescue operations and compensation 

Early rescue operations included four teams of National Disaster Response Force been rushed to Sikkim and five more teams were being sent from Kolkata. However, South and West Sikkim remained inaccessible delaying rescue operations owing to landslides caused by rainfall. A group of 14 tourists were rescued by the army from north Sikkim. The army had deployed 72 columns including infantry troops, combat engineers, four Dhruv and five Cheetah helicopters. Rain and landslides had hampered the rescue efforts of workers searching for survivors.300 people mostly labourers were given shelter in Chungthang Gurdwara.Food was prepared in gurdwara langar with more than 600 hot meals at all meal times.

Rescue and relief operations resumed in Sikkim since early in the morning on Tuesday with the weather showing signs of improvement. Road opening parties succeeded in restoring communication along NH31A and work was continuing to repair the North Sikkim Highway to Mangan and Chungthang. Fifteen helicopters were pressed into service to evacuate casualties and deploy rescue and relief columns in the affected areas of north and west Sikkim.

Lt Gen Bikram Singh, GOC-in-C, Eastern Command, also visited the earthquake-affected areas and met his senior staff officers to discuss the progress of Operation Trishakti Madad, the massive operation launched by the Army's 33 Corps to provide relief to those affected by Sunday's earthquake.

According to the Army, nearly 2,000 civilians are being provided shelter at eight Army relief camps at Gangtok, Chungthang, Pegong and Darjeeling. There are 400 others who have sought shelter at relief camps set up by the Indo-Tibetan Border Police. Several children from these camps even returned home on Tuesday and attended school

On Monday, when weather improved, Special Forces personnel slithered from helicopters into affected villages. Medical camps were set up and arrangements were made for casualty evacuation

21 engineering columns of the Army succeeded in restoring partial road connectivity to parts of north Sikkim on Tuesday. Telecommunications and power lines, that snapped due to the earthquake, were also restored.

In spite off all efforts, the highway to Gangtok remained badly affected due to landslides

See also
 List of earthquakes in 2011
 List of earthquakes in India
 List of earthquakes in Nepal

References

External links 
 Rediff.com: 40 killed in Sikkim quake; relief ops hit by landslides (slideshow)
 The Mw 6.9 Sikkim-Nepal Border Earthquake of September 18, 2011 – Earthquake Engineering Research Institute
 
 

2011 earthquakes
Earthquakes in India
Earthquakes in Nepal
Earthquakes in Bhutan
Earthquakes in Bangladesh
2011 disasters in India
History of Sikkim
2011 in India
2011 in Nepal
2011 in Bhutan
2011 in Bangladesh
September 2011 events in Asia
Disasters in Sikkim
Himalayas